Edward II of England was the King of England from 1307 till 1327.

Edward II may also refer to:
 Edward the Martyr, King of the English from 975 till 978.
 Edward II, Count of Bar, French count
 Edward II (play), a 1592 play by Christopher Marlowe
 Edward II (film), a 1991 film adaptation by Derek Jarman
 Edward II (ballet), a 1995 ballet adaptation with music by John McCabe
 Edward II (band), a British reggae/folk band
 Edward II, a 2017 German-language opera by Andrea Lorenzo Scartazzini

See also
 GWR 6000 Class 6023 King Edward II, a 1930-built operational GWR 4-6-0 steam locomotive
 The Life of Edward II of England, 1924 adaptation of the Marlowe play by Bertolt Brecht

Human name disambiguation pages